Nordhausen II is an electoral constituency (German: Wahlkreis) represented in the Landtag of Thuringia. It elects one member via first-past-the-post voting. Under the current constituency numbering system, it is designated as constituency 4. It comprises the city of Nordhausen within the Nordhausen district.

Nordhausen II was created in 1990 for the first state election. Since 2014, it has been represented by Katja Mitteldorf of The Left.

Geography
As of the 2019 state election, Nordhausen II comprises the municipality of Nordhausen, excluding the village of Buchholz, which is part of Nordhausen I.

Members
The constituency was held by the Christian Democratic Union (CDU) from its creation in 1990 until 2014, during which time it was represented by Egon Primas (1990–1994) and Klaus Zeh (1994–2014). It was won by The Left in 2014, and represented by Katja Mitteldorf. She was re-elected in 2019.

Election results

2019 election

2014 election

2009 election

2004 election

1999 election

1994 election

1990 election

References

Electoral districts in Thuringia
Nordhausen, Thuringia
1990 establishments in Germany
Constituencies established in 1990